Jérôme Pasquier was a French servant of Mary, Queen of Scots, involved in writing and deciphering coded letters.

Working for a captive queen

Pasquier is recorded as a groom of the chamber to Mary and master of her wardrobe. The other grooms were Bastian Pagez and Hannibal Stuart. He was described as "young Pasquier". Adam Blackwood described him as "commis et argentier", a clerk and treasurer or purse keeper. The French ambassador also called him a steward or argentier.

On 20 March 1586, at Chartley, Pasquier and Bastian Pagez witnessed a document in which Jacques Gervais, Mary's surgeon, placed his affairs in the hands of Jean de Champhuon, sieur du Ruisseau, a brother-in-law of Mary's secretary Claude Nau. Ruisseau was an administrator of Mary, Queen of Scots' French estates.

Pasquier worked with Mary's secretaries Claude Nau and Gilbert Curle managing Mary's correspondence. Letters in cipher from the French ambassador London, Guillaume de l'Aubéspine, Baron du Châteauneuf, were delivered to him. In May 1586, Mary said, and Gilbert Curle wrote, that she received an infinite number of letters in cipher. Curle translated Mary's French drafts or dictation into English and ciphered them. Nau was in charge of the French correspondence.

In August 1584 Pasquier worked on the deciphering of a long letter to Mary and Claude Nau from Albert Fontenay, a half-brother of Nau, which describes his visit to Scotland and negotiations with James VI. The letter describes the young king and his hobbies and has become an important source for his biography. Pasquier deciphered a letter to Mary in Spanish from Alexander Farnese, Duke of Parma in 1585.

Arrested and questioned
As the Babington Plot was investigated and revealed by Francis Walsingham, Pasquier was arrested in August 1586 with Mary's secretaries at the suggestion of Amias Paulet, who observed he was "half a secretary". He was moved to the house of Mr Littleton and the lodging of Thomas Gresley of Drakelow at Chartley. Walsingham told Paulet to send Pasquier to London under "sure guard". Paulet arranged for him to be taken to the Tower of London on 29 August escorted by three men.

Pasquier was questioned by Owen Hopton, Edward Barker, and the code expert Thomas Phelippes twice in September 1586. They showed him some examples of his code work. His responses are recorded in three surviving documents.  Pasquier confessed to writing and transcribing coded letters for Mary. He said that Nau was in charge of the cipher keys or alphabets. The cipher work took place in Nau's chamber. Pasquier delivered completed ciphered and deciphered letters to Mary or Nau. He claimed not to remember the contents of the letters. He did remember encoding a letter in cipher for Mary in 1584 to send to the French ambassador Michel de Castelnau asking him to negotiate a pardon for Francis Throckmorton after his treason trial.

William Cecil wrote to Christopher Hatton discussing the idea of threatening Nau, Curle, and Pasquier so they would confirm Mary's crime and ensure their own escape. Claude Nau mentioned that some significant letters, copied in French and English, were kept in chests belonging to Pasquier. One way of making a case against Mary was to find incriminating and treasonous material in her letters, but her distance from the material in cipher produced by her secretaries was a problem. Mary was able to deny writing to Anthony Babington with her own signature, and question the authenticity of any letters produced. Conyers Read argues that the secretaries were interviewed to demonstrate the genuineness of deciphered letters and that Mary was the author of her letters.

Walsingham sent news to the Scottish Court in September 1586 that Mary was to be moved to Fotheringhay, and that "the matters whereof she is guilty are already so plain and manifest (being also confessed by her two secretaries), as it is thought, they shall required no long debating".

Pasquier's evidence does not seem to have been directly used in Mary's treason trial. Walsingham and Phelippes focused on a letter sent to Babington written by Nau, the "bloody letter", and a cipher used to write to him found in her papers. Phelippes acknowledged that Mary usually sent more letters every fortnight "than it was possible for one body well exercised therein to put in cipher and decipher".

Pasquier and the evidence for Mary's secretariat presented at her trial
Pasquier had a lesser role in Mary's correspondence than Nau and Curle. In a draft for the procceedings at Mary's trial, William Cecil and others suggested relating how Mary directed the writing of her coded letters in English, by dictating them to Nau in French in her cabinet, and having Curle translate them into English for ciphering. This process, which was described by Curle and by Nau's confession, was a branch of correspondence that Paquier was not necessarily involved in, and he was not mentioned. The historian Conyers Read thought Pasquier was a minor figure in the intrigues leading to her execution.

After Mary's trial
Pasquier remained responsible for some household accounts and a distribution of cloth for livery clothes in Mary's household. He wrote to Phelippes in January 1587, concerning these financial matters. According to Adam Blackwood, who was informed by the account of Dominique Bourgoing, Mary came to distrust Pasquier and Nau, assuming that they had betrayed her. She cut them out of her will, and included a note of her concern about money received by Pasquier. Mary wrote from Fotheringhay to the Spanish diplomat Bernardino de Mendoza of her fear that they had hastened her death.

Pasquier and the two secretaries were released in August 1587 after Mary's funeral and given passports to return home. Pasquier carried a letter from the French ambassador in London to Henry III of France which included a short description of the funeral at Peterborough.

References

Court of Mary, Queen of Scots
16th-century French people
French cryptographers
Pre-19th-century cryptographers
Espionage scandals and incidents
Prisoners in the Tower of London